Artyomovsk or Artemovsk may refer to:
Artyomovsk, Russia, a town in Krasnoyarsk Krai, Russia
Artyomovsk Urban Settlement, a municipal formation which the district town of Artyomovsk in Kuraginsky District of Krasnoyarsk Krai is incorporated as
Artyomovsk, the former Soviet name for Bakhmut

See also
Artemivsk (disambiguation)